Renato Serio (born 5 October 1946) is an Italian composer, conductor and arranger.
 
Born in Lucca, Serio studied piano, conducting, composition and electronic music. He started his career in the 1960s collaboring with artists such as Shirley Bassey and Nini Rosso.

His collaborations include  B.B. King, Dionne Warwick,  Tom Jones, Bryan Adams, John Denver, Adriano Celentano, The Corrs,  The Manhattan Transfer, Andrea Bocelli, Sarah Brightman, Lucio Dalla,  Randy Crawford, Laura Pausini, Miriam Makeba, Riccardo Cocciante, Renato Zero, Anggun, Gianni Morandi, Dee Dee Bridgewater, Gino Vannelli, Antonello Venditti, Angelo Branduardi, Mia Martini, Jennifer Paige and Amedeo Minghi.

Was the impresario of the Polish singer Anna German. August 27, 1967, in Italy, on the road between Forli and Milan, Renato Serio — fell asleep at the wheel. They got into a serious car accident. At high speed the car impresario of the singer crashed into a concrete fence. Anna was thrown from the car through the windshield. She suffered multiple fractures, internal injuries. After the incident, Anna German  did not regain consciousness for a week, and Renato received only a fracture of the hand and foot.

Serio composed the music for several musical comedies by Garinei & Giovannini, as well as film scores including Innocence and Desire (1974), The Pumaman (1980), Hit Man (1982), Alone in the Dark (1982), The Third Solution (1988) and The Invisible Ones (1988). He also composed the music of the political anthem of Forza Italia.

References

External links 
 

 Renato Serio at Discogs

1946 births
Italian film score composers
Italian male film score composers
Musicians from Lucca
Italian male conductors (music)
Italian music arrangers
Living people
21st-century Italian conductors (music)
21st-century Italian male musicians